Dhankuta Multiple Campus is one of the constituent campuses of Tribhuvan University located in Dhankuta district of eastern Nepal. The campus was established in 1955/56. It is recognized by University Grants Commission (Nepal)

History
The campus was inaugurated by King Mahendra in May 1956. When the campus started, there were only six students and it was called a degree college. It offered degrees on intermediate and bachelor level in humanities and social sciences. In 1973, the campus was converted to a multiple campus based on the National Education System Plan of 1971. Faculty of Education was added on the same year.

Infrastructure
The campus has 100 acres of land that was donated by Bhakta Bahadur Basnet. It is run by 61 professors and 42 administrative staff.

References

Tribhuvan University
1955 establishments in Nepal
Buildings and structures in Dhankuta District